Afuá is a Brazilian municipality located in the state of Pará. Its population as of 2020 is estimated to be 39,567 people. The area of the municipality is 8,372.772 km2. The city belongs to the mesoregion Marajó and to the microregion of Furos de Breves.

The municipality is contained in the  Marajó Archipelago Environmental Protection Area, a sustainable use conservation unit established in 1989 to protect the environment of the delta region.
The municipal seat lies at the mouth of the Cajari River where it enters the Baía do Vieira Grande.
The municipality contains the  Charapucu State Park, a strictly protected conservation unit created in 2010.

References

Municipalities in Pará